Coporaque District may refer to:

 Coporaque District, Caylloma in Peru
 Coporaque District, Espinar in Peru